Tian Tian (born March 25, 1983) is a Chinese chess Woman Grandmaster.

From 1999 to 2002 she went to Hungary to take part in tournaments and youth team championships in order to gain the Woman Grandmaster (WGM) title, which she did by gaining norms at the First Saturday IM tournament November 2001 and the First Saturday IM Group B tournament in December 2001, both held in Budapest.

Her current Elo rating is 2106 (February 2021). Her highest Elo rating was 2355 from July to December 2001. At that time she was tenth on the Chinese women's ranking list and 77th in the female world rankings. She was coached by Ji Yungi, a chess instructor and trainer of the Qingdao Chess Center.

China Chess League
Tian Tian has played for Chongqing chess club in the China Chess League (CCL).

See also
Chess in China

References

External links

1983 births
Living people
Chinese female chess players
Chess woman grandmasters
Chess players from Chongqing